50 Divisions refers to the 50 divisions of construction information, as defined by the Construction Specifications Institute (CSI)'s MasterFormat beginning in 2004. Before 2004, MasterFormat consisted of 16 Divisions. MasterFormat has continued to be updated and revised since 2004, with new numbers, titles, and a new division added in 2010 and additional  updates completed in 2010, 2011, 2012, 2014, 2016, and 2018.

"50 Divisions" is the most widely used standard for organizing specifications and other written information for commercial and institutional building projects in the United States and Canada. Standardizing the presentation of such information improves communication among all parties.

Divisions
The latest officially released version of MasterFormat is the 2018 Edition, which uses the following Divisions:

PROCUREMENT AND CONTRACTING REQUIREMENTS GROUP:
Division 00 — Procurement and Contracting Requirements

SPECIFICATIONS GROUP

General Requirements Subgroup
Division 01 — General Requirements

Facility Construction Subgroup
Division 02 — Existing Conditions
Division 03 — Concrete
Division 04 — Masonry
Division 05 — Metals
Division 06 — Wood, Plastics, and Composites
Division 07 — Thermal and Moisture Protection
Division 08 — Openings
Division 09 — Finishes
Division 10 — Specialties
Division 11 — Equipment
Division 12 — Furnishings
Division 13 — Special Construction
Division 14 — Conveying Equipment
Division 15 — Plumbing + HVAC
Division 16 — Electrical + Lighting
Division 17 — RESERVED FOR FUTURE EXPANSION
Division 18 — RESERVED FOR FUTURE EXPANSION 
Division 19 — RESERVED FOR FUTURE EXPANSION

Facility Services Subgroup:
Division 20 — Mechanical Support
Division 21 — Fire Suppression
Division 22 — Plumbing
Division 23 — Heating Ventilating and Air Conditioning
Division 24 — RESERVED FOR FUTURE EXPANSION
Division 25 — Integrated Automation
Division 26 — Electrical
Division 27 — Communications
Division 28 — Electronic Safety and Security
Division 29 — RESERVED FOR FUTURE EXPANSION
Site and Infrastructure Subgroup:
Division 30 — RESERVED FOR FUTURE EXPANSION
Division 31 — Earthwork
Division 32 — Exterior Improvements
Division 33 — Utilities
Division 34 — Transportation
Division 35 — Waterways and Marine Construction
Division 36 — RESERVED FOR FUTURE EXPANSION
Division 37 — RESERVED FOR FUTURE EXPANSION
Division 38 — RESERVED FOR FUTURE EXPANSION
Division 39 — RESERVED FOR FUTURE EXPANSION

Process Equipment Subgroup:
Division 40 — Process Interconnections
Division 41 — Material Processing and Handling Equipment
Division 42 — Process Heating, Cooling, and Drying Equipment
Division 43 — Process Gas and Liquid Handling, Purification and Storage Equipment
Division 44 — Pollution Control Equipment
Division 45 — Industry-Specific Manufacturing Equipment
Division 46 — Water and Wastewater Equipment
Division 47 — RESERVED FOR FUTURE EXPANSION
Division 48 — Electrical Power Generation
Division 49 — RESERVED FOR FUTURE EXPANSION

References 

Johnson, Robert W. (2004). Masterformat 2004 Edition: Master List of Numbers and Titles for the Construction Industry. Alexandria, Va.: The Construction Specifications Institute. .

Construction
Construction documents